Odessa/Strawberry Lakes Aerodrome  is located  north-northeast of Odessa, Saskatchewan, Canada.

See also 
 List of airports in Saskatchewan

References 

Registered aerodromes in Saskatchewan
Francis No. 127, Saskatchewan